Motta may refer to:

People
 Motta (surname)
 nickname of Mordechai Gur (1930–1995), Israeli politician, lieutenant general and the 10th Chief of Staff of the Israel Defense Forces
 Motta Navas (born 1966), Indian serial killer

Other uses
 Motta, Graubünden, a settlement in Brusio, Graubünden, Switzerland
 Battle of Motta (1412), fought at Motta di Livenza, Italy

See also
 Mota (disambiguation)
Motta Baluffi, a municipality of Cremona, Italy
Motta Camastra, a municipality of Messina, Italy
Motta d'Affermo, a municipality of Messina, Italy
Motta de' Conti, a municipality of Vercelli, Italy
Motta di Livenza, a municipality of Treviso, Italy
Motta Montecorvino, a municipality of Foggia, Italy
Motta San Giovanni, a municipality of Reggio Calabria, Italy
Motta Santa Lucia, a municipality of Catanzaro, Italy
Motta Sant'Anastasia, a municipality of Catania, Italy
Motta Visconti, a municipality of Milan, Italy
Motta Vigana, a civil parish of Massalengo, Italy